Merulempista cyclogramma is a moth of the family Pyralidae. It is known from China (Guangxi), Indonesia (Sumatra), India and Sri Lanka.

External links
Review of the genus Merulempista Roesler, 1967 (Lepidoptera, Pyralidae) from China, with description of two new species

Moths described in 1896
Phycitini